Moonshiners is an American docudrama television series on the Discovery Channel that dramatizes the life of people who produce (illegal) moonshine in the Appalachian Mountains of Kentucky, North Carolina, South Carolina, Tennessee, and Virginia. The series dramatizes their liquor production efforts, law-evading techniques and lives.

The series premiered on December 6, 2011. The twelfth season premiers on November 9, 2022.

Series overview

The + following the number of episodes indicates the number of specials aired during that season.

Episodes

Season 1 (2011–12)

Season 2 (2012–13)

Season 3 (2013–14)

Season 4 (2014–15)

Season 5 (2015–16)

Season 6 (2016–17)
Season six started on November 15, 2016.

Season 7 (2017–18)

Season 8 (2018–19)

Season 9 (2019–20)

Season 10 (2020–21)

Season 11 (2021–22)

Season 12 (2022)

References

External links

Lists of American reality television series episodes
Moonshine in popular culture